Samuel Barnes (c. 1865 – 13 March 1951) was an English-born Australian politician.

He was born in Cornwall to miner Samuel Meyn Barnes and Jane Mitchell. He was a timber worker, and after suffering a serious leg injury emigrated to Victoria around 1886. He worked for the Treasury Department before becoming a mine manager at Walhalla. He held a supervisory position during the construction of the Long Tunnel mines, and served on the Walhalla Shire Council from 1905 to 1910 (president 1909–10).

In 1910, Barnes was elected to the Victorian Legislative Assembly for Walhalla as a Liberal, later transitioning to the Nationalist Party. He was briefly a minister without portfolio from September to November 1917, and served as Minister of Railways and Mines from 1918 to 1923. He lost his seat to a Country Party candidate in 1927 and retired from politics. Barnes died in Fitzroy in 1951.

References

1865 births
1951 deaths
Nationalist Party of Australia members of the Parliament of Victoria
Members of the Victorian Legislative Assembly